Eucereon marmoratum is a moth of the subfamily Arctiinae. It was described by Arthur Gardiner Butler in 1877. It is found in Suriname and the Amazon region.

References

 Arctiidae genus list at Butterflies and Moths of the World of the Natural History Museum

marmoratum
Moths described in 1877